Gerald Francis "Jerry" Joyce (born 1956) is a senior vice president and chief science officer at Salk Institute for Biological Studies and was previously the director of the Genomics Institute of the Novartis Research Foundation. He is best known for his work on in vitro evolution, for the discovery of the first DNA enzyme (deoxyribozyme), for his work in discovering potential RNA world ribozymes, and more in general for his work on the origin of life.

Joyce received his Bachelor of Arts from the University of Chicago in 1978, completed his M.D. and Ph.D. at the University of California, San Diego in 1984.  He was a postdoctoral fellow and senior research associate at the Salk Institute from 1985 to 1989, and joined Scripps in 1989. Joyce was elected to the U.S. National Academy of Sciences in 2001, to the American Academy of Arts and Sciences (2011) and to the Institute of Medicine (2014). He has been a professor at The Scripps Research Institute until 2016 and served as Dean of the Faculty at Scripps from 2006 to 2011, during which time he was instrumental in founding a second campus in Jupiter, Florida. Joyce has served as the chair of the JASON advisory group, which he joined in 1996.

Joyce received the Urey medal of the International Society for the Study of the Origin of Life (ISSOL) in 2005.
In 2009, Joyce's lab was the first to produce a self-replicating in vitro system, capable of exponential growth and continuing evolution, composed entirely of RNA enzymes.

Awards
NAS Award in Molecular Biology, 1994
Pfizer Award in Enzyme Chemistry, 1995
Herbert W. Dickerman Award, 1997
Hans Sigrist Prize, 1997
H. C. Urey Award, 2005
Dannie Heineman Prize, 2009
Stanley Miller Medal, 2010

References

External links
Summary of Joyce's research
Gerald Joyce profile 
Joyce receiving the Urey Medal
The Joyce Laboratory at The Scripps Research Institute
Gerald Joyce at the Salk Institute for Biological Studies

1956 births
Living people
Members of the United States National Academy of Sciences
American biochemists
People from San Diego
University of California, San Diego alumni
Scripps Research faculty
Fellows of the American Academy of Arts and Sciences
Members of JASON (advisory group)
Novartis people
Salk Institute for Biological Studies people
Members of the National Academy of Medicine